Brandjacking is an activity whereby someone acquires or otherwise assumes the online identity of another entity for the purposes of acquiring that person's or business's brand equity. The term combines the notions of 'branding' and 'hijacking', and has been used since at least 2007 when it appeared in Business Week referencing the term used in a publication by the firm MarkMonitor (MarkMonitor and its PR firm, the Zeno Group, coined the phrase; MarkMonitor registered "BrandJacking Index" as a trademark, but not the term "brandjacking" on its own). The tactic is often associated with use of individual and corporate identities on social media or Web 2.0 sites, as described in Quentin Langley's 2014 book Brandjack, and may be used alongside more conventional (offline) campaign activities.

While similar to cybersquatting, identity theft or phishing in nature and in possible tactics, brandjacking is usually particular to a politician, celebrity or business and more indirect in its nature. A brandjacker may attempt to use the reputation of its target for selfish reasons or seek to damage the reputation of its target for hostile, malicious or for political or campaigning reasons. These reasons may not be directly financial, but the effects on the original brand-holder may often include financial loss - for example, negative publicity may result in the termination of a celebrity's sponsorship deal, or, for a corporation, potentially lead to lost sales or a reduced share price.

Brandjacking examples
 Coca-Cola - in 2013, a commercial, "The Bitter Taste of Sugar", for Oxfam (Oxfam Novib Netherlands) parodied a Coca-Cola Zero commercial, drawing attention to its unsustainable business practices.  
 Starbucks - in 2006, a YouTube-hosted video presented a spoof advert for a Starbucks Frappuccino underlining the contrast between consumption and poverty.
 Nestle - in March 2010, Greenpeace campaigners used a YouTube video that parodied Nestlé's KitKat 'Take a Break' advertising, to draw attention to the multinational's use of palm oil from unsustainable operations in Indonesia and the consequent impact on Orangutan habitats. Protesters outside Nestlé's UK head office in Croydon carried signs with the words 'Give me a break' and 'Killer' printed in the distinctive red and white Gill Sans.
 Exxon Mobil - in 2008, a Twitter account (@ExxonMobilCorp) was set up purporting to be the views of an official spokesperson for the oil company, only for it later to be exposed as fake.
 Also on Twitter, @BPglobalPR is not an official voice for BP, but a satirical account that has grown in popularity during the 2010 Deepwater Horizon oil spill, attracting more followers than the official BP Twitter account.
 Politicians - fake Facebook pages were created for US President Barack Obama and US Republican governor Sarah Palin (among other politicians). Major corporations have also been the subject of brandjack-based protests on Facebook.
 Fake blogs - may be considered a form of brandjacking if created by a critic or opponent of the person or brand supposed to be behind the blog.
 Affiliate Brand Bidding - This is a tactic used by some affiliate marketers. Some consider such tactics unethical or Black Hat. The method is to bid on keywords related to your site / product, but to do so seemingly as a competitor.
Colleges and Universities - In 2008, college guidebook company College Prowler created hundreds of Facebook groups purporting to consist of actual incoming first-year students of various universities in order to surreptitiously gather their personal data and promote the business.
In June 2011, Greenpeace activists launched a campaign against Mattel's use of a packaging supplier, APP, said to be desecrating Indonesian rainforests, using images of Mattel dolls Barbie and Ken. A Greenpeace video showed Ken dumping Barbie ("I don't date girls who are into deforestation"), the group created a mock Twitter feud and a stunt involving Barbie in a pink bulldozer, and unfurled a banner on the wall of Mattel’s Los Angeles headquarters; some  500,000 people sent protest emails to Mattel. In October 2011, Mattel announced a global policy to keep rainforest destruction out of its supply chains. Brandjack author Quentin Langley praised Greenpeace for its integration of online (YouTube, Twitter) and offline (stunts, etc.).

Brandjacking avoidance 
Brandjacking avoidance may include:
 Pre-emptive registration of brand names and sub-brands as screen names on social media sites.
 Staying vigilant 
 Use of social media and general media monitoring tools to seek evidence of infringement
 Legal action against those seen as responsible for the infringement.
However, action against the brandjackers and their supporters can actually draw attention to the problem (the Streisand effect). For example, following Greenpeace's KitKat campaign, Nestlé had the video removed from YouTube, but Greenpeace quickly re-posted it to video-sharing site Vimeo.com and highlighted the attempted censorship using Twitter and other social media. Attempts by Nestlé to constrain user activity on its Facebook fan page further fanned the controversy.

See also 
 Culture jamming
 Cybersquatting
 Fake blog
 Identity theft
 Phishing
 Subvertising

References

External links
 Online brand-jacking increasing

Identity theft
Cybercrime